Mohiyapur, also known as Sec 163 in Noida (New Okhla Industrial Development Authority), is a planned city in Uttar Pradesh, India.

References

Villages in Gautam Buddh Nagar district